= Afrilearn =

Nigerian educational technology company

Afrilearn is a Nigerian educational technology company that provides digital learning resources for primary and secondary school students across Africa.

== History ==
Afrilearn was founded in 2019 by Isaac Oladipupo and Gabriel Olatunji-Legend. During the 2020 COVID-19 pandemic, Afrilearn launched ClassNotes.ng for open access to curriculum-based class notes and revision tools.

Afrilearn's app includes class notes, animated video lessons, exam practice exercises, coding lessons, and a personalized learning dashboard. Afrilearn's platform includes modules for national examinations such as WAEC, NECO, JAMB and BECE.

== Awards ==
- Digital Innovation of the Year, U.S. Chamber of Commerce, 2020.
- UNICEF Innovation Fund, 2022.
